Alexis Panisse (born 21 June 1993) is a Dominican middle-distance runner.

She won gold medals over 1500 and 5000 metres at the 2012 Central American and Caribbean Junior Championships in Athletics in San Salvador. She attended Benjamin N. Cardozo High School in Bayside, New York.

References

External links

1993 births
Living people
Dominican Republic female sprinters
Place of birth missing (living people)
Benjamin N. Cardozo High School alumni
Track and field athletes from New York City